Houaich    is a  town in Akkar Governorate, Lebanon.

The population of Houaich is mostly Sunni Muslim.

History
In 1838, Eli Smith noted  the village as el-Huweish,  located south of esh-Sheikh Mohammed. The  inhabitants were Sunni Muslims.

References

Bibliography

External links
Houaich, Localiban 

Populated places in Akkar District
Sunni Muslim communities in Lebanon